The Kelley School of Business (KSB) is an undergraduate and graduate business school at Indiana University in Bloomington, Indiana and Indianapolis, Indiana, United States. , approximately 7,500 full-time undergraduate and graduate students are enrolled on its Bloomington campus, as well as 1,740 students at the Indianapolis campus. In addition, more than 800 students  study for graduate degrees through the school's online MBA and MS programs through "Kelley Direct".

History 

The school was established as "School of Commerce and Finance" of Indiana University in 1920. It was subsequently renamed "School of Business Administration" in 1933 and "School of Business" in 1938. In 1997, it was named "Kelley School of Business" after its alumnus E.W. Kelley, chairman of the Steak n Shake Company, who had given a donation of $23 million.

Initially, it was housed in the Commerce Building constructed in 1923 (William A. Rawles Hall since 1971), moving to the Business and Economics Building in 1940 (called Woodburn Hall since 1971), and finally to today's Business School building in 1966.

Although classes had been held in Indianapolis since 1961, it wasn't until the fall of 1974 that the Kelley School of Business officially expanded to Indianapolis. It resides in the Business/Spea building on the IUPUI campus. During the expansion, it was said that the Kelley School of Business is "one school, one faculty, one curriculum in two locations". The dean's office is located on the Bloomington campus, but two positions, Executive Associate Dean - Indianapolis and Associate Dean of Indianapolis Research and Programs, were created to lead the Kelley School of Business curriculum, faculty and programs at IUPUI.

Completed in 2003, the $33 million Graduate and Executive Education Center provides facilities to the Kelley School's graduate and executive education students.

In 2003, the Kelley School partnered with the Scotts Miracle-Gro Company to launch Bloomington Brands, a unique brand management work-study program for both undergraduates and MBA students.  Participating students manage the Osmocote Plant Food brand under contract from Scotts.  Bob Stohler, a former Scotts executive, instructs and oversees the students.  Students manage all marketing variables for the Osmocote brand, including the selection of product formulas, sizes, packages, and pricing, as well as the development of marketing strategy, advertising, media purchase and selection, promotional activities, and consumer research.  Brands students work closely with multiple business functions at Scotts.

In the summer of 2005, interim Dean Dan Smith was appointed to be the new dean of the school, replacing Dean Dan Dalton who stepped down in 2004.

On March 30, 2012, the Kelley School renamed its Undergraduate Building Hodge Hall in honor of James R. Hodge who had given $15 million to help renovate and expand the facility. The $60 million expansion and renovation of Hodge Hall broke ground in May 2012 and opened in the fall of 2014. The Eli Lilly Foundation donated a substantial amount as well.

In June 2012, Dan Smith stepped down as dean of the school after serving as dean for seven years to take a new position as president and CEO of the Indiana University Foundation. On May 9, 2013, interim dean Idalene Kesner was announced as the new dean of the school. Kesner is the first woman to serve as dean

Rankings

Undergraduate School 

The Kelley School of Business undergraduate program has been ranked in the top 15 in the nation for over fifteen years and in the top 10 in the last six, across various publications.

In its most recent ranking, Bloomberg Businessweek ranked the Kelley School of Business 1st among public business schools. Overall, it was ranked the 4th in the nation for its undergraduate B.S. in Business out of more than 100 of the top business schools in America. In 2015, Kelley was also ranked 4th. The 2016 ranking for "Best Undergraduate Business Schools" by Poets & Quants ranked the Kelley School of Business 7th in the nation and 2nd among public schools. Kelley is also ranked 2nd in academic excellence. In 2017, Poets & Quants ranks Kelley 6th in the nation, and 2nd in terms of employment. It lists an acceptance rate of around 37% and an average ACT and SAT of 30 and 1370 respectively. The Kelley School of Business is ranked 10th overall for its Undergraduate Business Program according to U.S. News & World Report. In a 2016 survey of over 1,000 recruiters by Bloomberg Businessweek, the undergraduate school was ranked 4th in the nation, 1st among public universities. Kelley also ranked No. 1 as the school ‘Most Recommended by Alumni’ and ‘Best Career Advising” by Poets and Quants.

In 2019, U.S. News ranked these undergraduate programs within the top 15 in the nation:
 Accounting: 8th                              
 Entrepreneurship: 3rd                        
 Finance: 7th                                
 Management: 6th                             
 Management Information Systems: 6th         
 Marketing: 7th                            
 Production/Operations Management: 13th       
 Quantitative Analysis: 11th                  
 Real Estate: 12th

As of late 2017, 10 business concentrations have been ranked in the Top 20. The undergraduate Entrepreneurship & Corporate Innovation major has been ranked 1st among public universities for the last 9 consecutive years.

Graduate school 
In 2021, the Kelley MBA was ranked No. 26 by Bloomberg Businessweek.

In 2021, the Kelley Online MBA was ranked No. 1 by Poets & Quants. and #3 by US News.

In 2017, The Economist ranked the Kelley Master of Business Administration (MBA) program #22 in the world (17th in the U.S.). The Kelley MBA was ranked 16th by Business Week in 2014; it was ranked fifth for regional MBA programs by the Wall Street Journal in 2007.  Poets & Quants ranked Kelley's MBA program 5th in the nation in producing Fortune 500 CEOs. Bloomberg Businessweek ranked its full-time MBA program at No. 15 in the 2012 edition, and at No. 4 among all public universities. US News & World Report ranks the Kelley MBA 22nd in the nation, 7th among public business schools. Kelley's top-ranked MBA program for full-time residential students has been cited in Business Week as one of the favorites of corporate recruiters looking for general managers, marketing talent, and finance graduates.

The 2017 U.S. News & World Report ranks Kelley's Online Graduate Business Program #1 in the nation, and the online MBA #3.

Teaching quality in core classes has been ranked No. 1 in the nation by both the Princeton Review and Businessweek. The school's doctoral program has contributed to overall teaching and research by sending more than 1,000 doctoral graduates to key positions in industry and academe.

The Graduate Entrepreneurship concentration has been ranked 1st for 3 consecutive years.
In the 2010 QS Global 200 Business Schools Report the school was indexed as the 24th best business school in North America. Fortune Small Business magazine listed Kelley's MBA and undergraduate programs in entrepreneurship #1 among all public universities in the nation in 2009.

A 2017 report by Crist|Kolder Associates listed Indiana University 5th in producing current Fortune 500 CEOs and 1st in producing Fortune 500 CFOs among public institutions.

The Kelley School of Business is among the elite 25 percent of business programs internationally accredited by the AACSB International — The Association to Advance Collegiate Schools of Business. Kelley is also one of only 180 institutions accredited by the AACSB in Accounting.

Academics
The Business/SPEA Information Commons on the Bloomington campus serves the research and study needs of students and faculty of both the Kelley School of Business and Indiana University's School of Public and Environmental Affairs.

Notable alumni

Klaus Agthe, former chairman of the board and CEO of ASEA Brown Boveri 
Evan Bayh, former United States Senator from Indiana
Steve Bellamy, founder of The Tennis Channel and Kodak President of Motion Picture and Entertainment
John Chambers, president and chief executive officer (CEO) of Cisco Systems
Joe Clayton, former chairman of the board of Sirius Satellite Radio
Mark Cuban, billionaire and owner of the Dallas Mavericks
Scott Dorsey, co-founder of ExactTarget, co-founder of High Alpha
Jeff M. Fettig, chairman and CEO of the Whirlpool Corporation
Deepender Singh Hooda, the youngest member of the Parliament of India
E.W. Kelley, "modern-day" founder of Steak 'n Shake. His philanthropic actions have led to the naming of the Kelley School of Business.
Harold Poling, former chief executive officer and chairman of Ford Motor Company
Frank Popoff, former president and chief executive officer of The Dow Chemical Company
Jay Schottenstein, billionaire and owner of DSW, Inc. and American Eagle Outfitters
David Simon, chief executive officer of Simon Property Group
Michael Szymanczyk, chairman and chief executive officer of Altria and Philip Morris USA
Mauricio Tohen, Distinguished Professor, and Chairman of the Department of Psychiatry & Behavioral Sciences at the University of New Mexico
Randy Tobias, former chief executive officer of Eli Lilly and Company and former U.S. Ambassador
Todd Wagner, chief executive officer of 2929 Entertainment, founder of Todd Wagner Foundation, co-founder of Broadcast.com
Jimmy Wales, former chief executive officer of Bomis, co-founder of Wikipedia, president of the Wikimedia Foundation
Robert James Waller, author of The Bridges of Madison County

Notable faculty
Alexandra, Countess of Frederiksborg, professor - former Princess of Denmark
David B. Audretsch, professor - award-winning economist, published author, and founder and editor-in-chief of Small Business Economics
Michael Baye, professor - former Director of the Bureau of Economics for the US Federal Trade Commission
Shelli Yoder, professor - former Democratic Party nominee for the U.S. House of Representatives

See also
Economics
Glossary of economics

References

External links 
 – Bloomington website
 – IUPUI website

Business schools in Indiana
Indiana University
Educational institutions established in 1920
Education in Monroe County, Indiana
Buildings and structures in Bloomington, Indiana
1920 establishments in Indiana